Obviously is the seventh studio album by American band Lake Street Dive. It was released on March 12, 2021, by Nonesuch Records. This was the group's last album to feature founding member and lead guitarist Mike "McDuck" Olson.

Background
Obviously was recorded and completed before the COVID-19 pandemic with an intended release date in the fall of 2020 before being postponed. The album's songs address topics such as climate change, womanhood, female empowerment, and failed relationships.

Critical reception

Mark Kennedy of the Associated Press gave the album a positive review, praising it for its cohesive direction and for the production allowing the band to be "given a chance to shine in every song". However, Marc Hirsh of The Boston Globe was mixed in his review of the album, criticizing multiple tracks such as the "unfocused" "Making Do" and the "dull" "Know That I Know", although he called "Being a Woman" and "Hypotheticals" the album's two highlights.

Track listing

Personnel
Credits for Obviously adapted from Tidal.

Lake Street Dive
 Rachael Price - vocals, writing
 Bridget Kearney - vocals, background vocals, bass, synthesizer, writing
 Michael Calabrese - drums, writing, background vocals, percussion
 Akie Bermiss - vocals, keyboards, synthesizer, piano, background vocals, writing
 Mike "McDuck" Olson - guitar, mandolin, strings, trumpet, writing

Additional musicians
 Kristin Andreassen - background vocals
 Anthony Lamarchina - cello
 Bruce Christensen - viola
 Alan Umstead - violin
 Catherine Umstead - violin
 Jung-Min Shin - violin
 Kathryn Vanosdale - violin

Technical
 Mike Elizondo - producer
 Chris Gehringer - mastering
 Lawson White - engineering
 Zach Stokes - assistant
 Adam Hawkins - mixing

Design
 Dewey Saunders - artwork
 Shervin Lainez - photography
 Leo Krauss - prints

Charts

References

2021 albums
Lake Street Dive albums
Nonesuch Records albums